The National Space Society (NSS) is an American international nonprofit 501(c)(3) educational and scientific organization specializing in space advocacy. It is a member of the Independent Charities of America and an annual participant in the Combined Federal Campaign. The  society's vision is:  "People living and working in thriving communities beyond the Earth, and the use of the vast resources of space for the dramatic betterment of humanity."

The society supports human spaceflight and robotic spaceflight, by both the public (e.g., NASA, Russian Federal Space Agency and Japan Aerospace Exploration Agency) and private sector (e.g., SpaceX, Blue Origin, Virgin Galactic, etc.) organizations.

History
The society was established in the United States on March 28, 1987,  by the merger of the National Space Institute, founded in 1974 by Dr. Wernher von Braun, and the L5 Society, founded in 1975 based on the concepts of Dr. Gerard K. O'Neill.

The society has an elected volunteer Board of Directors and a Board of Governors. The chairman of the Board of Governors is United States Air Force Colonel Karlton Johnson (retired).  The chairman of the Board of Directors is Kirby Ikin. 

The National Space Society was awarded the "Five-Star Best in America" award by the Independent Charities of America organization in 2005.

In 2014, the National Space Society launched the Enterprise In Space program. In order to ignite interest in space and science, technology, engineering, art and math (STEAM) education, Enterprise In Space plans to design, build, and launch a 3D-printed spacecraft into Earth orbit carrying 100+ experiments from K to postgraduate student teams. The orbiter is planned to be returned to Earth with the experiments for the student teams to analyze.

Ad Astra
The Society publishes a magazine Ad Astra, which appears quarterly in print and electronic form.

International Space Development Conference
The society hosts an annual International Space Development Conference (ISDC) held in major cities throughout the United States, often during or close to the Memorial Day weekend.

NSS Chapters network

As listed in each quarterly issue of Ad Astra, a large number of NSS chapters exist around the world. The chapters may serve a local area such as a school, city or town, or have a topical or special interest focus, such as a rocketry or astronomy club, or educational/community outreach program. Chapters are the peripheral organs of the society by organizing events, communicating with the public on the merits and benefits of space exploration, and working to educate political leaders.

National Space Society of Australia
A  strong contingent of chapters is located in Australia. Prior to the NSI-L5 merger, the L5 Society had been developing chapters around the world, and in Australia, three chapters had been established. The 'Southern Cross L5 Society' was formed in 1979, with groups in Sydney, Adelaide (in 1984) and Brisbane (in 1986). It was decided in late 1989 to create the National Space Society of Australia (NSSA) which could act as an umbrella organization

Similar efforts have taken hold in Brazil, Canada, and Mexico, as well as European countries that have a strong aerospace presence. including France, Germany, and the Netherlands.

Awards
The society administers a number of awards. These are typically presented during the annual International Space Development Conference that NSS hosts.  These awards are in recognition of individual volunteer effort, awards for NSS chapter work, the "Space Pioneer" award, and two significant awards which are presented in alternate years.

Robert A. Heinlein Memorial Award
The Robert A. Heinlein Memorial Award, is given in even-numbered years (2004, 2006, etc.) to "honor those individuals who have made significant, lifetime contributions to the creation of a free spacefaring civilization.

Heinlein Award Winners:

2018 - Dr. Freeman Dyson
2016 - Dr. Jerry Pournelle
2014 - Elon Musk
2012 - Dr. Stephen Hawking
2010 - Dr. Peter Diamandis
2008 - Burt Rutan
2006 - Brigadier General Charles E. "Chuck" Yeager
2004 - Capt. James Lovell
2002 - Robert Zubrin
2000 - Neil Armstrong
1998 - Dr. Carl Sagan
1996 - Dr. Buzz Aldrin
1994 - Dr. Robert H. Goddard
1992 - Gene Roddenberry
1990 - Dr. Wernher von Braun
1988 - Sir Arthur C. Clarke
1986 - Dr. Gerard K. O'Neill

NSS Von Braun Award
The NSS Von Braun Award is given in odd-numbered years (1993, 1995, etc.) "to recognize excellence in management of and leadership for a space-related project where the project is significant and successful and the manager has the loyalty of a strong team that he or she has created."  Awardees include:

Von Braun Award Winners:
2019 - Tory Bruno
2017 - Prof. Johann-Dietrich Wörner
2015 - Mars Curiosity Rover project Team
2013 - Dr. A.P.J. Abdul Kalam
2011 - JAXA Hayabusa Team
2009 - Elon Musk
2007 - Steven W. Squyres
2005 - Burt Rutan
2001 - Donna Shirley
1999 - Robert C. Seamans, Jr.
1997 - George Mueller
1995 - Max Hunter
1993 - Dr. Ernst Stuhlinger

Other scholarships and award activities
Other scholarships and award activities NSS provides or assists with include the following awards:

The Space Pioneer Awards
The NSS-ISU scholarship, worth $12,000, to the International Space University. Application deadline is December 31 of each year, for study during the following year. The 2005 recipient was Robert Guinness of St. Louis;
EURISY international youth science fiction writing competition (NSS provided US support in 2005), and;
Permission to Dream space adventure for students, teachers, and parents from the Space Frontier Foundation which is partly sponsored by NSS.

Affiliations
The National Space Society is an alliance organization of the Meade 4M Community, the Coalition for Space Exploration, in support of the educational initiatives and outreach of NSS, and a founding executive member of the Alliance for Space Development.

See also

L5 Society
Space advocacy
Space colonization
Space exploration
Vision for Space Exploration
Space Kingdom of Asgardia

References

"National Space Society 'blitzes' Congress on NASA budget" Space.com - Mar. 5, 2007
"National Space Society to Host 26th Annual Conference in Dallas, Convening Pioneers from Government and Private Space Programs" SpaceRef.com - Feb. 21, 2007
GuideStar - National Space Society Information on NSS listed in GuideStar, a national database of nonprofit organizations

External links
 
 Ad Astra ("To the Stars') The magazine of the National Space Society
 Island One Society, ISDC conferences archive

Space organizations
Space advocacy organizations
International scientific organizations
Non-profit organizations based in Washington, D.C.
Scientific societies based in the United States
501(c)(3) organizations
1987 in science
Organizations established in 1987
1987 establishments in Washington, D.C.